Berens may refer to:

In places:
 Berens Islands, Nunavut, Canada
Berens River a river in Manitoba, Canada
Berens River Airport, an airport in Manitoba, Canada

In people:
 Berens (surname)

See also
Beren (disambiguation)